Rayane Hamidou (born 13 April 2002) is a Saudi Arabian-Malawian professional footballer who plays as a right back for Al-Ahli.

Club career
Hamidou started his career at Al-Ahli and was called up to the first team in July 2021. On 16 August 2021, Hamidou signed his first professional contract with the club. He made his league debut for the club on 25 August 2021 by starting the match against Damac. On 29 January 2022, Hamidou joined Al-Tai on loan.

Honours

International
Saudi Arabia U23
WAFF U-23 Championship: 2022

References

External links
 
 

2002 births
Living people
Association football fullbacks
Saudi Arabian footballers
Malawian footballers
Sportspeople from Jeddah
Saudi Arabia youth international footballers
Saudi Professional League players
Saudi First Division League players
Al-Ahli Saudi FC players
Al-Tai FC players
Naturalised citizens of Saudi Arabia